Dompierre-sur-Mer (literally Dompierre on Sea) is a commune in the Charente-Maritime department, southwestern France.

Population

Personalities
 Auguste-Louis de Rossel de Cercy
 Jacques Archambault, Early settler of New France with his wife and seven children. Dug first well in Ville-Marie Montreal for Paul Chomedey de Maisonneuve.

See also
 Communes of the Charente-Maritime department

References

External links
 

Communes of Charente-Maritime